An emergency is a situation that poses an immediate risk to health, life, property, or environment.

Emergency or The Emergency may also refer to:

States of emergency
 Malayan Emergency, the guerrilla war in Malaya 1948–1960
 The Emergency (India), the state of emergency 1975–1977
 The Emergency (Ireland), a state of emergency during World War II
 State of Emergency (disambiguation)

Arts and entertainment

Film and television
 Emergency (1962 film), a British drama film
 Emergency (2022 film), an American comedy thriller film
 Emergency!, a 1970s American TV series
 Emergency +4, an animated series based on the American TV series
 Emergency (1995 TV program), a Philippine TV documentary
 Emergency (1959 Australian TV series), an Australian drama series
 Emergency (2020 Australian TV series), an Australian factual series

Gaming
 Emergency (video game series), from 1998
 Emergency (video game), the first in the series

Literature
 Emergency: This Book Will Save Your Life, a 2009 book on survival preparedness by Neil Strauss
 The Emergency: A Personal History, a 2015 book by Coomi Kapoor about The Emergency in India

Music
 The Emergency and Joel Plaskett Emergency, a Canadian rock band
 Emergency Records, a record label

Albums 
 Emergency! (album), by The Tony Williams Lifetime
 Emergency (Kool & the Gang album), 1984
 Emergency (The Pigeon Detectives album), 2008
 Emergency: Quantum Leap, a 2019 EP by X1

Songs 
 "Emergency" (Paramore song), 2005
 "Emergency" (Tank song), 2010 
 "Emergency" (Icona Pop song), 2015
 "Emergency" (WizzyPro song), 2013
 "Emergency", a 2012 song by Audio Playground featuring Snoop Dogg
 "Emergency", a song by Girlschool from the 1980 album Demolition
 "Emergency", three singles by Mavado
 "Emergency", a song by Motörhead from the 1981 EP St. Valentine's Day Massacre
 "Emergency", a 2009 song by Steve Rushton
 "Emergency", a song by The Whispers from the 1981 album Love Is Where You Find It
 "Emergency", a song by Wonderland from the 2011 album Wonderland
 "Emergency", a song by 999 from the 1978 album 999
 "Emergency (Dial 999)", by Loose Ends, 1984

Other uses
 Emergency (organization), a humanitarian NGO

See also
 
 Emergence (disambiguation)
 Emergen-C, a vitamin supplement 
 Emergency department, a medical treatment facility 
 Emergency management